Korukkupet is a neighbourhood in the northern part of Chennai. It is served by the Korukkupet railway station.

Location
Korukkupet shares its boundaries with Mint and Basin Bridge in the south, Tondiarpet in the north, Washermanpet in the east and Buckingham Canal and Vyasarpadi in the west.

Infrastructure
As of 2010, a flyover is under construction at the Cocraine Basin Road level crossing which is expected to ease congestion in the area; however, it has been delayed.

Transport
MTC routes

Rail
The Korukkupet railway station is on the Chennai Central-Gummidipoondi/Sulurpet line.
 Metro Rail
The area is located around 2 km distance from Washermanpet metro station. 
Now under construction of Korukkupet metro rail station in under Sir Thiyagaraya college campus in Thiruvottiyur highway.

References

External links
Central Railside Warehouse Company
(13 dec 2019)

Neighbourhoods in Chennai
Suburbs of Chennai
Cities and towns in Chennai district